Kwon Ki-bum (Hangul: 권기범, born September 22, 1984), known as Bumkey (Hangul: 범키), is a South Korean R&B singer under Brand New Music. He made his musical debut in 2010 as part of the hip hop duo 2winS and is currently a member of the Korean hip hop and R&B quartet Troy.

Life and career 
Kwon Ki-bum was born September 22, 1984 in Seoul. His family moved to Los Angeles in 1999, where he lived for five years before returning to Korea alone in 2004 to pursue a music career.

Early in his career, he featured on songs by both underground and mainstream hip hop artists including Dynamic Duo, Brown Eyes, and Epik High, being credited as either Kwon Ki-bum or Bumkey. However, after undergoing vocal chord surgery to treat a chronic sore throat, he was left unable to speak. It was two years before he regained his singing ability.

In 2010, Bumkey debuted as part of the duo 2winS (Korean: 투윈스) with TopBob, formerly of the hip hop group TBNY. The duo promoted actively on Korean music shows with Supreme Team and on various radio programs throughout 2010. Bumkey also featured in songs by Paloalto, Dok2, SouLime, and Dynamic Duo.

After signing with Brand New Music, Bumkey made his solo debut with the single "Bad Girl," in April 2013. The song was produced by Primary and featured E-Sens of Supreme Team. Bumkey released his second single, "Attraction," in August with a music video starring Crayon Pop's Ellin. The song was a success, ranking fifth on the Instiz , a collation of all real-time Korean music charts, for the third week of August and topping the Gaon Digital Singles Chart. Bumkey performed in Crayon Pop's PopCon concert in Seoul on October 30.

In 2014, Brand New Music introduced its new hip hop group Troy, with Bumkey as group leader. Bumkey was part of a world tour in May (as part of the Asian Music Festival) with Verbal Jint, Beenzino, Sanchez, and Troy bandmate Kanto, performing in New York City, Seattle, Los Angeles, and Sydney, Australia. He married former Planet Shiver member Kang Da-hye in June.

In October 2014, Bumkey was arrested and charged with selling and taking illegal substances, specifically ecstasy and Philopon, a type of methamphetamine. Bumkey denied the allegations. In April 2015, the court found him to be not guilty.

Personal life
On June 13, 2014, Bumkey married DJ Kang Da-hye in Samseong-dong, Seoul. His wife gave birth to a son on July 27, 2016.

Discography

Studio albums

Singles

Collaborations

Awards

References 

South Korean male rappers
South Korean hip hop singers
Brand New Music artists
1984 births
Living people
Musicians from Seoul
21st-century South Korean male  singers